Act of Love may refer to:
Act of Love (politics) a political statement by Jeb Bush that became an important part of the 2016 Republican Presidential Primary campaign 
Act of Love (1953 film), a 1953 American romantic drama film
Act of Love (1980 film), a 1980 American made-for-TV film
 Act of Love (novel), 1981 novel by Joe R. Lansdale
 "Act of Love", a song by Neil Young and Pearl Jam from Mirrorball, 1995

See also
Acts of Love (disambiguation)